Nola pustulata, the sharp-blotched nola, is a nolid moth (family Nolidae). The species was first described by Francis Walker in 1865.

The MONA or Hodges number for Nola pustulata is 8989.

References

Further reading

External links
 

pustulata
Articles created by Qbugbot
Moths described in 1865